This is a list of awards, recognitions and achievements won by the group t.A.T.u.

Awards and nominations
{| class="wikitable sortable plainrowheaders" 
|-
! scope="col" | Award
! scope="col" | Year
! scope="col" | Nominee(s)
! scope="col" | Category
! scope="col" | Result
! scope="col" class="unsortable"| 
|-
! scope="row" rowspan=2|BMI London Awards
| rowspan=2|2004
| rowspan=2|"All the Things She Said"
| Award-Winning Song
| 
| rowspan=2|
|-
| College Radio Song of the Year
| 
|-
! scope="row" | Bed of the Year Award
| 2001
| Themselves
| Sex Dissidents
| 
|
|-
! scope="row" | Dvizhenie Awards
| 2003
| Themselves
| Best Group
| 
| 
|-
! scope="row" | Eska Music Awards
| 2003
| Themselves
| Event of the Year
| 
| 
|-
! scope="row" | Eurovision Song Contest
| 2003
| "Ne ver', ne boysia"
| Best Song
| 
| 
|-
! scope="row"|GQ Awards
| 2006
| Themselves
| Women of the Year
| 
|
|-
! scope="row" | Golden Gramophone Awards
| 2002
| "Not Gonna Get Us"
| Golden Gramophone Award
| 
| 
|-
! scope="row" rowspan=3|Hit FM Awards
| 2001
| "All the Things She Said"
| rowspan=3|100% Hit
| 
| rowspan=3|
|-
| 2002
| "Not Gonna Get Us"
| 
|-
| 2003
| "Ne ver', ne boysia"
| 
|-
! scope="row" | IFPI Hong Kong Top Sales Music Awards
| 2003
| 200 km/h in the Wrong Lane
| Top 10 Best Selling Foreign Albums
| 
| 
|-
! scope="row" | IFPI Platinum Europe Awards
| 2002
| 200 km/h in the Wrong Lane
| Album Title
| 
| 
|-
! scope="row" |Jabra Music Awards
|2007
| Themselves
| Best Band in the World
| 
|
|-
! scope="row" rowspan=2|Japan Gold Disc Awards
| rowspan=2|2004
| Themselves
| International New Artist of the Year
| 
| rowspan=2|
|-
| 200 km/h in the Wrong Lane
| International Album of the Year
| 
|-
! scope="row" | Los Premios MTV Latinoamérica
| 2003
| Themselves
| Best New Artist — International
| 
| 
|-
! scope="row" | Love Radio Awards
| 2009
| Themselves
| Group of the Year
| 
|
|-
! scope="row" | Lunas del Auditorio
| 2007
| Themselves
| Best Foreign Pop Artist
| 
|
|-
! scope="row" rowspan=2|MTV Asia Awards
| rowspan=2|2004
| rowspan=2|Themselves
| Favorite Breakthrough Artist
| 
| rowspan=2|
|-
| Favorite Pop Act
| 
|-
! scope="row" rowspan=4|MTV Europe Music Awards
| 2001
| rowspan=4|Themselves
| rowspan=4|Best Russian Act
| 
| 
|-
| 2002
| 
| 
|-
| 2003
| 
| 
|-
| 2006
| 
| 
|-
! scope="row"|MTV Italian Music Awards
| 2006
| Themselves
| Best Group
| 
| 
|-
! scope="row" rowspan=6|MTV Russia Music Awards
| rowspan=5|2006
| rowspan=3|Themselves
| Artist of the Year
| 
| rowspan=5|
|-
| Group of the Year
| 
|-
| Pop Act of the Year
| 
|-
| rowspan=2|"All About Us"
| Song of the Year
| 
|-
| Video of the Year
| 
|-
| 2008
| Themselves
| MTV Legend 
| 
|
|-
! scope="row" | MTV Video Music Awards
| 2001
| "All the Things She Said"
| Viewer's Choice - Russia
| 
| 
|-
! scope="row" | MTV Video Music Brazil
| 2003
| "All the Things She Said"
| Best International Video
| 
| 
|-
! scope="row" rowspan=8| Muz-TV Awards
| rowspan=4|2003
| rowspan=2|Themselves
| Best Dance Act
| 
| rowspan=4|
|-
| Best Pop Group
| 
|-
| 200 km/h in the Wrong Lane
| Album of the Year
| 
|-
| "A Simple Motion"
| Video of the Year
| 
|-
| rowspan=4|2006
| Themselves
| Best Pop Group
| 
| rowspan=4|
|-
| Lyudi Invalidy
| Album of the Year
| 
|-
| rowspan=2|"All About Us"
| Song of the Year
| 
|-
| Video of the Year
| 
|-
! scope="row" rowspan=3|NRJ Radio Awards
| 2003
| rowspan=3|Themselves
| Best International New Artist
| 
| rowspan=3|
|-
| rowspan=2|2006
| Best International Group
| 
|-
| Best International Pop
| 
|-
! scope="row" | Ovaciya Awards
| 2002
| "Not Gonna Get Us"
| Best Song
| 
| 
|-
! scope="row" rowspan=2|Polish Internet Music Awards
| rowspan=2|2003
| Themselves
| Best International Band
| 
| rowspan=2|
|-
| 200 km/h in the Wrong Lane
| Best International Album
| 
|-
! scope="row" rowspan=2|Popov Radio Awards
| rowspan=2|2007
| rowspan=2|Themselves
| Best Radio Contribution
| 
| rowspan=2|
|-
| Special Award
| 
|-
! scope="row" rowspan=2 |Viva Comet Awards
| 2003
| rowspan=2|Themselves
| Best International Newcomer
| 
|
|-
| 2008
| Special Award
| 
|
|-
! scope="row" rowspan=3|World Music Awards
| rowspan=3|2003
| rowspan=3|Themselves
| World's Best Selling Pop Group Artist
| 
| rowspan=3|
|-
| World's Best Selling Dance Group
| 
|-
| World's Best Selling Duo
| 
|-
! scope="row" rowspan=7|ZD Awards
| rowspan=6|2006
| rowspan=3|Themselves
| Outstanding Contribution to Music 
| 
| 
|-
| Best Pop Group
| 
| rowspan=5|
|-
| Best Dance Act 
| 
|-
| t.A.T.u.'s Return 
| Music Moment of the Year
| 
|-
| Lyudi Invalidy
| Album of the Year
| 
|-
| "All About Us"
| Video of the Year
| 
|-
| 2007
| Themselves
| Best Group
| 
| 
|-
!scope="row" rowspan=2|Žebřík Music Awards
| 2002
| rowspan=2|Themselves
| rowspan=2|Best International Průser
| 
| 
|-
| 2005
| 
|

References

Awards
Tatu